Katherine 'Kath' Gillespie Sells MBE is a psychotherapist, writer, disability rights campaigner and LGBT rights campaigner from the United Kingdom. She founded REGARD, a national, volunteer-run organisation of disabled lesbians, gay men, bisexuals and transgender people.

Sells was a ward sister at Barnet General Hospital when she became disabled as a result of a splinter in her finger, which led to septicaemia, a coma for several days and the loss of the finger. This led to spinal thecal arachnoiditis and she eventually needed to use a wheelchair.
After becoming disabled she re-trained as a teacher completing a Certificate in Education at Middlesex University. 
Sells was Joint Head of Training with Jane Campbell (later Baroness Campbell of Surbiton) at Disability Resource Team in Camden. 
She has three sons, one of whom is the singer and songwriter Dan Gillespie Sells. Her marriage ended while her first two children were very young and she came out as a lesbian, raising her children with her now ex-partner Dr. Dilis, who was the biological mother of another son, and coparenting with her ex-husband.

She is the co-author of The Sexual Politics of Disability with Tom Shakespeare and Dominic Davies published by Cassell 1996
She was also co-author of 'She Dances to Different Drums' published by The Kings Fund 1996.

She was nominated as a Stonewall Hero of the Year 2010.

In 2011 she was awarded the MBE for services to disabled lesbian, gay, bisexual and transgender people in the Queen's Birthday Honours List.

References

External links 
REGARD
Interview with Sells

Living people
British disability rights activists
English lesbian writers
British LGBT rights activists
Members of the Order of the British Empire
Year of birth missing (living people)